The AGM-158 JASSM (Joint Air-to-Surface Standoff Missile) is a low observable standoff air-launched cruise missile developed by Lockheed Martin for the United States Armed Forces. It is a large, stealthy long-range weapon with a  armor piercing warhead. It completed testing and entered service with the U.S. Air Force in 2009, and has entered foreign service in Australia, Finland, and Poland as of 2014. An extended range version of the missile, the AGM-158B JASSM-ER (Joint Air-to-Surface Standoff Missile-Extended Range), entered service in 2014. By September 2016, Lockheed Martin had delivered 2,000 total JASSMs comprising both variants to the USAF.

Program overview

Origins 
The JASSM project began in 1995 after the cancellation of the AGM-137 TSSAM project. The TSSAM was designed as a high precision stealthy missile for use at stand-off ranges, but poor management of the project resulted in rising costs. Since the requirement for such weapons still existed, the military quickly announced a follow-up project with similar goals. Initial contracts for two competing designs were awarded to Lockheed Martin and McDonnell Douglas in 1996, and the missile designations AGM-158A and AGM-159A were allocated to the two weapons. Lockheed Martin's AGM-158A won and a contract for further development was awarded in 1998.

The AGM-158A is powered by a Teledyne CAE J402 turbojet. Before launch the wings are folded to reduce size. Upon launch the wings deploy automatically. There is a single vertical tail. Guidance is via inertial navigation with global positioning system updates. An imaging infrared seeker provides target recognition and terminal homing. A data link allows the missile to transmit its location and status during flight, allowing improved bomb damage assessment. The warhead is a WDU-42/B  penetrator. The JASSM may be carried by a wide range of aircraft: the F-15E; F-16; F/A-18; F-35; B-1B; B-2; and B-52 are all intended to carry the weapon.

The Center for Strategic and Budgetary Assessments (CSBA) has suggested lightening the warhead of the AGM-158A to increase its range. That way it would be able to be fired a greater distance from enemy air defenses while being cheaper and available in greater numbers for protracted conflicts than the AGM-158B JASSM-ER variant.

Problematic development 
In 1999, powered flight tests of the missile began. These were successful, and production of the JASSM began in December 2001. The weapon began operational testing and evaluation in 2002. Late that year, two missiles failed tests and the project was delayed for three months before completing development in April 2003. Two more launches failed, this time as a result of launcher and engine problems. In July 2007, a $68 million program to improve JASSM reliability and recertify the missile was approved by the Pentagon. A decision on whether to continue with the program was deferred until spring 2008. Lockheed agreed to fix the missiles at its own cost and tightened up its manufacturing processes.

On 27 August 2009, David Van Buren, assistant secretary of the Air Force for acquisition, said that there would be a production gap for the JASSM while further tests were held. Further tests in 2009 were more successful however, with 15 out of 16 rounds hitting the intended target, well above the 75% benchmark set for the test. This cleared JASSM for entry into service. The United States Air Force plans to acquire up to 4,900 AGM-158 missiles. Meanwhile, the United States Navy had originally planned to acquire 453 AGM-158 missiles but instead pulled out of the program in favor of retaining the proven AGM-84 SLAM-ER.

Foreign sales

Australia 
In 2006 the Australian government announced the selection of the Lockheed Martin JASSM to equip the Royal Australian Air Force's F/A-18 Hornet fighters. This announcement came as part of a program to phase out the RAAFs F-111C strike aircraft, replacing the AGM-142 Popeye stand off missile and providing a long-range strike capability to the Hornets. JASSM was selected over the SLAM-ER after the European Taurus KEPD 350 withdrew its tender offer, despite the KEPD 350 being highly rated in the earlier RFP process, due to their heavily involvement in the series preparation for the German Air Force, their troop trials in South Africa and their final negotiations with the Spanish Air Force which finally led to a contract. As of mid-2010 the JASSM is in production for Australia and will soon enter service.

Finland 
Finland had also previously planned to purchase JASSM missiles for the Finnish Air Force as part of modernization plans of its F/A-18 Hornet fleet. However, in February 2007 the United States declined to sell the missiles, while agreeing to proceed as planned with other modernization efforts (the so-called Mid-Life Update 2, or MLU2). This episode led to speculation in the Finnish media on the state of Finnish – American diplomatic relations. However, in October 2011 the US DSCA announced that they had given permission for a possible sale to Finland. An order, valued 178.5 million Euros was placed in March 2012. and since Lockheed has received three Finnish integration-related projects. Finland's integration work was originally scheduled to be completed by the end of 2016, but didn't complete until March 2018 when Finnish F/A-18 Hornets successfully test fired two JASSM missiles at Naval Air Weapons Station (NAWS) China Lake.

South Korea 
In 2013 South Korea sought the JASSM to boost the South Korean Air Force's striking capability but was refused by Washington.
The South Korean government instead turned their attention towards the Taurus KEPD 350 missile.

Poland 
In 2014, Poland requested US Congressional approval for the purchase of the AGM-158 JASSM to extend the deep penetration strike capabilities of their F-16 Block 52+ fighters. Congress approved the sale in early October, and negotiations concluded in early November 2014. Poland signed a $250 million contract to upgrade its F-16s and equip the jets with (AGM-158) JASSM advanced cruise missiles in a ceremony at Poznan AB, Poland, on 11 December 2014. The missiles are expected to enter operational service in 2017, and Poland is contemplating an additional purchase for the long-range JASSM-ER version. In December 2015 the production contract for Lot 13 was signed. The contract includes 140 JASSMs for Finland, Poland and the US, 140 JASSM-ER missiles for the US, and data, tooling and test equipment. It is said to be the last production lot that will include non-ER versions. Poland's first modified F-16s should be ready by 2017, when the first missiles are delivered. The work is scheduled to be complete by June 29, 2019. In November 2016 The U.S. State Department approved the possible sale of 70 AGM-158B JASSM-ER to Poland.

Improved JASSM versions

AGM-158B JASSM-ER 
The US Air Force studied various improvements to the AGM-158, resulting in the development of the JASSM-Extended Range (JASSM-ER), which received the designation AGM-158B in 2002. The JASSM-ER has 70% hardware commonality and 95% software commonality with the original AGM-158 JASSM.

The first flight test of the JASSM-ER occurred on May 18, 2006 when a missile was launched from a U.S. Air Force B-1 bomber at the White Sands Missile Range in New Mexico. The initial platform for the JASSM-ER is the B-1. While both the original JASSM and the JASSM-ER are several inches too long to be carried in the internal weapons bay of the F-35 Lightning II, the F-35 will be able to carry both missiles externally, which would compromise the aircraft's stealth features.

The JASSM-ER entered service with the USAF in April 2014.  Although the B-1 was initially the only aircraft able to deploy it, it was later integrated onto the B-52, F-15E, and F-16; the B-1B can carry a full load of 24 JASSM-ERs, the B-2 16 missiles, and the B-52 outfitted with the 1760 Internal Weapons Bay Upgrade (IWBU) is able to carry 20 JASSM-ERs, eight internally and 12 on external pylons. It is also carried on U.S. Navy F/A-18E/F Super Hornet and F-35C fighters. The Air Force approved full-rate production of the JASSM-ER in December 2014. Integration of the JASSM-ER onto the B-52 and F-16 was expected to wrap up in 2018, with the F-15E completed after that; it was announced that the JASSM-ER achieved full operational capability on the F-15E in February 2018. Lot 15 production contract, awarded in June 2017 was the first consisting entirely JASSM-ER.

On 14 May 2015, the head of the Air Force Research Laboratory nominated the JASSM-ER as the optimal air vehicle to carry the Counter-electronics High Power Microwave Advanced Missile Project (CHAMP) payload.  CHAMP is an electronic warfare technology that fries electronic equipment with bursts of high-power microwave energy, non-kinetically destroying them. The JASSM-ER was chosen because it is an operational system, so CHAMP is to be miniaturized into the operationally relevant system.

In November 2019, the Air Force retired the AGM-86C/D air-launched cruise missile (ALCM), a conventional warhead-equipped version of the nuclear-tipped ALCM, with its role replaced by the JASSM-ER.

In September 2021, Australian Prime Minister Scott Morrison announced that Australia would acquire the JASSM-ER for the RAAF's F/A-18F Super Hornet and F-35A fighters.

AGM-158C LRASM 

The JASSM-ER is also the basis for Long Range Anti-Ship Missile, which is a stealthy JASSM-ER with a new seeker. The Air Force used the B-1 Lancer to complete a captive carry test of an LRASM to ensure the bomber can carry it, as both missiles use the same airframe. The LRASM was not originally planned to be deployed on the B-1, being intended solely as a technology demonstrator, but in February 2014 the Pentagon authorized the LRASM to be integrated onto air platforms, including the Air Force B-1, as an operational weapon to address the needs of the Navy and Air Force to have a modern anti-ship missile. In August 2015, the Navy officially designated the air-launched LRASM as "AGM-158C". The LRASM achieved Early Operational Capability on the B-1B in December 2018.

AGM-158B-2
In March 2016, Lockheed Martin began analysis on an enhanced wing design to further increase range. In September 2018, the corporation was awarded a contract to develop an "Extreme Range" variant of the AGM-158. Originally called the JASSM-XR and later designated the AGM-158D, it features a new missile control unit, changes to the wings, a different paint coating, an Electronic Safe and Arm Fuze, secure GPS receiver, and program protection requirements at a unit cost of $1.5 million. Low-rate initial production began in 2021 as part of Lot 19 with deliveries beginning in January 2024 at a rate of five per month for the first 40 missiles. The designation was later changed again to the AGM-158B-2.

Mass firing of AGM-158
In 2020 and 2021, the Air Force Research Laboratory and Lockheed developed and tested Rapid Dragon, a multiple AGM-158 launcher module to be airdropped by C-130 or C-17 cargo planes as a low cost method of rapidly providing a surge of mass fired JASSMs using unmodified airlift assets.

On 09 November 2022, Rapid Dragon was demonstrated off Norway in the Norwegian Sea at the Andøya Space Defense Range using a MC-130J Commando II from the 352nd Special Operations Wing (67th Special Operations Squadron), as part of Exercise Atreus.

Operational history 
The JASSM was first employed during the 14 April 2018 missile strikes against Syria during the Syrian Civil War. Two B-1 Lancers fired a total of 19 JASSMs as part of strikes against three Syrian government alleged chemical weapons targets. All 19 JASSM missiles were fired at the Barzah Research Center, which was destroyed in the strike. According to Russian state media, two missiles that failed to detonate were found by the Syrian Arab Army and transferred to Russia on 18 April for study - no evidence of this claim has been provided; initial reports had stated JASSM-ER missiles were used, but it was later clarified that baseline JASSM models were employed.

On 27 October 2019, at the end of the Barisha raid to capture or kill Abu Bakr al-Baghdadi, the then-leader of the Islamic State of Iraq and the Levant (ISIL) terror organization, a number of AGM-158B missiles were used to completely level the compound where the raid took place, marking the second time the missile has been used in combat.

Operators

Current operators 

 Royal Australian Air Force

 Finnish Air Force

 Polish Air Force

 United States Air Force

Future operators 

 German Air Force

See also 
 AGM-137 TSSAM
 Storm Shadow
 Saber
 KEPD 350 (Taurus missile)
 Hatf-VIII (Ra'ad)
 SOM (missile)
 Wan Chien
 List of missiles

References

External links 

 CSIS Missile Threat – JASSM / JASSM-ER
 Lockheed Martin JASSM Website
 Lockheed Martin AGM-158 JASSM – Designation Systems
 GlobalSecurity.org

Air-launched cruise missiles
AGM-158
Cruise missiles of the United States
Weapons and ammunition introduced in 2009